Jorge Quinteros is a Chilean mountaineer who has an extensive career as explorer, guide and teacher. Together with Harold William Tilman they were the first to traverse the Southern Patagonian Ice Field in the summer of 1955-1956. Currently he works in Dirección General de Aguas and teaches at the University of Chile.

Sources
Jorge Quinteros: Leyenda de la Montaña, Revista Viaje, El Mercurio.

Year of birth missing (living people)
Living people
Chilean mountain climbers
Academic staff of the University of Chile